Smith Warehouse is a historic tobacco storage warehouse located at Durham, Durham County, North Carolina.  It was built in 1906, and is a two-story Romanesque style brick structure divided into 12 70-foot-wide units by projecting corbeled firewalls.  The building measures 850 feet long and 100 feet wide and features ornamental brickwork.  It is an example of "slow burn" masonry and wood factory construction. It was the last of the 12 brick tobacco storage warehouses erected by The American Tobacco Company trust beginning in 1897.  The building has been converted for academic and administrative uses.

It was listed on the National Register of Historic Places in 1985.

References

Tobacco buildings in the United States
Industrial buildings and structures on the National Register of Historic Places in North Carolina
Romanesque Revival architecture in North Carolina
Industrial buildings completed in 1906
Buildings and structures in Durham, North Carolina
National Register of Historic Places in Durham County, North Carolina
1906 establishments in North Carolina